Daviesia oppositifolia, commonly known as rattle-pea, is a species of flowering plant in the family Fabaceae and is endemic to the south-west of Western Australia. It is an erect shrub with many stems, egg-shaped phyllodes with the narrower end towards the base, and yellow flowers with maroon markings.

Description
The flowers are arranged in leaf axils in one or two groups of five to ten flowers surrounded by three large involucral bracts, green at first, later deep copper-maroon.

Taxonomy
Daviesia oppositifolia was first described in 1838 by Stephan Endlicher in the journal Annalen des Wiener Museums der Naturgeschichte from specimens collected near King George Sound. The specific epithet (oppositifolia) means "opposite-leaved".

Distribution and habitat
Rattle-pea grows in forest with Eucalyptus species and mainly occurs in the Stirling Range but is also found near Denmark and Cheyne Beach, in the Esperance Plains and Jarrah Forest biogeographic regions of south-western Western Australia.

Conservation status 
This daviesia is listed as "not threatened" by the Western Australian Government Department of Parks and Wildlife.

References 

oppositifolia
Flora of Western Australia
Taxa named by Stephan Endlicher
Plants described in 1838